Long Live Robin Hood is a 1971 swashbuckler film directed by Giorgio Ferroni. It is based on the Robin Hood legend. It also has been known under its translated Italian name Archer of Fire.

Cast 
Giuliano Gemma as Robin Hood
Mark Damon as Allan
Luis Dávila as Sir Robert
Silvia Dionisio as Lady Marianne
Mario Adorf as Brother Tuck 
Manuel Zarzo as Will Scarlet
Nello Pazzafini as Little John
Pierre Cressoy as Sir Guy
Daniele Dublino as Prince John
Helga Liné as Matilde
Neno Zamperla as one of Robin's men
Lars Bloch as King Richard Lionheart (as Lars Block)
Pupo De Luca as Wrong Priest (as Gianni De Luca)
Giulio Donnini as Priest at Wedding Ceremony
Furio Meniconi as Innkeeper

Production
Long Live Robin Hood was partially shot at Colegiata y Castillo de Cardona in Barcelona, Spain.

Release
Long Live Robin Hood was released in Italy on March 12, 1971. It was released in the United States in 1976.

Footnotes

References

External links

1971 films
1970s adventure films
Italian adventure films
Spanish adventure films
French adventure films
Robin Hood films
Films directed by Giorgio Ferroni
Films set in London
Films scored by Gianni Ferrio
Cultural depictions of Richard I of England
Cultural depictions of John, King of England
1970s Italian films
1970s French films